"Starlight" is a song recorded by South Korean singers Taeyeon and Dean for Taeyeon's second extended play Why (2016). The song was released on June 25, 2016, by SM Entertainment as the EP's lead single. The song's lyrics were penned by Jam Factory's Lee Seu-ran, while its music was composed by Jamil "Digi" Chammas, Taylor Mckall, Tay Jasper, Adrian McKinnon, Leven Kali, Sara Forsberg, and MZMC. "Starlight" is a pop and R&B song that features synthesizers in its instrumentation. Its lyrics detail a romantic relationship.

The single received generally positive reviews from music critics, who were favorable towards its musical styles and Dean's appearance. It peaked at number five on South Korea's Gaon Digital Chart and charted at number six on the US Billboard World Digital Songs. A music video for the song was directed by Im Seong-gwan and was released simultaneously with the release of the song. Filmed in Los Angeles, California, the visual depicts Taeyeon and Dean as a loving couple. Although Taeyeon never performed the song live on music shows, "Starlight" achieved the number-one spot on KBS2's Music Bank on July 8, 2016. The track was included on the setlist of Taeyeon's concert series Butterfly Kiss, taking place in Seoul and Busan in July and August 2016.

Background and composition

Taeyeon officially debuted as a solo singer in October 2015 with the extended play I, which was a commercial success, peaking at number two on South Korea's Gaon Album Chart and has sold over 140,000 copies in the country. Following the success of I, Taeyeon released a single for S.M. Entertainment's digital music platform SM Station titled "Rain", which was a number-one hit on South Korea's Gaon Digital Chart. As her popularity consolidated, S.M. Entertainment announced on June 17, 2016, that Taeyeon's second extended play Why would be released on June 28. It was also announced that "Starlight" featuring alternative R&B singer Dean would be released as the EP's lead single on June 25. "Starlight" is a midtempo 1990s retro pop and R&B song which features "bright" synthesizers in its instrumentation. Meanwhile, a writer from Special Broadcasting Service wrote that "Starlight" drew influences from R&B and EDM. The song's lyrics detail a romantic relationship with the lyrics "You are my starlight, shine on my heart / When I’m with you, it feels like I’m dreaming all day / You are my starlight, I get so happy / Your love is like a gift."

Reception 
The single received generally positive reviews from music critics, who praised the song's musical styles. Jung So-young from OSEN (Online Sports and Entertainment News) described the song as having a "pleasant" feeling.

Promotion 
Taeyeon embarked on a series of concerts titled Butterfly Kiss. The concert took place in Seoul at Olympic Park on July 9–10, 2016, and in Busan at the KBS Hall on August 6–7, 2016. "Starlight" was included on the setlist of the show, which consisted of 22 songs in total.

In August 2019, she performed this song with NCT Jaehyun at 2019 SMTOWN Live in Tokyo

Credits and personnel 
Credits are adapted from the CD liner notes of Why.
 Recorded at S.M. Blue Ocean Studio
 Lyrics by Lee Seu-ran (Jam Factory (music publisher))
 Composed by Jamil "Digi" Chammas, Taylor McKall, Tay Jasper, Adrian Mckinnon, Leven Kali, Sara Forsberg, MZMC
 Arranged by Jamil "Digi" Chammas, Taylor McKall, Tay Jasper, Leven Kali
 Administered by MARZ Music Group, LLC and MZMC Publishing

Charts

Accolades

Music program awards

See also 
 List of Music Bank Chart winners (2016)

Notes

References 

2016 songs
2016 singles
Dean (South Korean singer) songs
Taeyeon songs
Korean-language songs
SM Entertainment singles
Songs written by Sara Forsberg